Kalaw Avenue (formerly T.M. Kalaw Street) is a short stretch of road in the Ermita district of Manila, Philippines. It forms the southern boundary of Rizal Park running east–west from San Marcelino Street to Roxas Boulevard near the center of the city. It begins as a four-lane road at the intersection with San Marcelino widening to an eight-lane divided roadway along the stretch of Rizal Park from Taft Avenue west to Roxas Boulevard. It has a short extension into the reclaimed area of Luneta and Quirino Grandstand as South Drive. The avenue's main section between Taft Avenue and Roxas Boulevard is assigned as National Route 155 (N155) of the Philippine highway network.

The avenue was named after Teodoro Kalaw, a Filipino legislator and historian of the Philippine Commonwealth period who also served as Director of the National Library of the Philippines (whose post-War incarnation lies along the street). It was formerly known as San Luis Street (Spanish: calle San Luis).

Landmarks

Kalaw Avenue is the main access to some of Rizal Park's main attractions, such as the National Museum of Natural History (former Department of Tourism Building), Museo Pambata, National Library of the Philippines, and Manila Ocean Park. Just across the street from Rizal Park are the Central United Methodist Church, the Luneta Hotel, and the Eton Baypark residential tower. The Casino Español de Manila, destroyed during World War II, was rebuilt on its original site in 1951 near the avenue's intersection with Taft Avenue, which housed the Instituto Cervantes de Manila. Also located at this eastern end of Kalaw are the Plaza Salamanca, the Manila Prince Hotel, and the Masagana Superstore (SM Savemore). The National Historical Commission of the Philippines has its headquarters in Rizal Park along Kalaw Avenue, just beside the National Library. The back entrance of the Manila Doctors Hospital is also located along Kalaw Avenue via the Norberto Ty Medical Tower, which opened in 2016.

See also
 List of renamed streets in Manila

Notes

References

Streets in Manila
Ermita